Elston Grey-Turner  (16 August 1916 – 20 January 1984) was a British medical doctor who served in World War II and was on the staff of the British Medical Association for many years.

The son of surgeon George Grey Turner, he was educated at Winchester College and Trinity College, Cambridge.   He qualified in medicine in 1942.

He joined the Royal Army Medical Corps and served as regimental medical officer to the 2nd Battalion of the Coldstream Guards, 1942–1945.  Among his assignments, he served at the Battle of Monte Cassino.  He was awarded the Territorial Decoration, and also the Military Cross.

In 1948, he joined the staff of the British Medical Association.  He was secretary from 1976–79.  He was made vice president in 1982.

He was a diarist whose notes about the war, the British Medical Association, and the development of the National Health Service have served as primary source material for researchers. He also was the Association's historian, and co-author of History of the British Medical Association.

He is buried at St Peter's Church, Petersham.

His papers are archived at the Wellcome Library.

References

1916 births
1984 deaths
Alumni of Trinity College, Cambridge
Burials at St Peter's, Petersham
Commanders of the Order of the British Empire
People educated at Winchester College
Recipients of the Military Cross
Royal Army Medical Corps officers
British diarists